Alex Nodari (born 15 February 1982) is an Italian footballer who plays for Riccione at Eccellenza Emilia–Romagna.

Biography
Born in Ravenna, Nodari played 5 matches for Ravenna Calcio in 2000–01 Serie B. Nodari played the first match of that season on 23 December 2000 (round 17), substituted Emanuele Pellizzaro in the last minutes. That match Ravenna won Ancona 1–0. He played his first start on 22 April (round 32), losing to Sampdoria 0–2 and started the last 3 matches of the season (round 36 to 38). Ravenna as the second from the bottom and relegated.

In the next season he left for Alessandria

He then left for non-professional teams including Cattolica and Derthona, which he won promotion to Serie D from Eccellenza for the latter team in 2004. He also played a charity match as a member of European star against the Rest of the World in 2004, which he was picked by Harry Redknapp, the football manager of Portsmouth and the coach of the World team. He was also had a trail for Portsmouth at that time. After failed to secure a contract after the left of Redknapp, Nodari played another season for Derthona.

In 2009–10 season, he played for Serie D side Valleverde Riccione, but after the club relocated to Rimini, Nodari remained in Riccione for newly found Eccellenza club A.S.D. Riccione 1929.

References

External links
 LaSerieD.com Profile 
 Riccione Profile 
 Calciatori.com Profile 

Italian footballers
Serie B players
Ravenna F.C. players
U.S. Alessandria Calcio 1912 players
Association football defenders
Sportspeople from Ravenna
1982 births
Living people
Campionato Sammarinese di Calcio players
U.S.D. Novese players
Footballers from Emilia-Romagna